Jamie Gleeson (born 15 January 1985) is an English footballer who plays for Poole Town.

Career
Gleeson was born in Poole and began his career as a trainee at Southampton before joining Kidderminster Harriers in 2004. He played seven matches in the Football League with the Harriers before returning south to Eastleigh and then Dorchester Town.

On 4 June 2015, after a 10-year spell with Dorchester Town, Gleeson signed with Poole Town on a one-year deal.

Gleeson also works as a David Beckham impersonator.

References

External links
 

English footballers
English Football League players
1985 births
Living people
Southampton F.C. players
Kidderminster Harriers F.C. players
Eastleigh F.C. players
Dorchester Town F.C. players
Poole Town F.C. players
Association football midfielders